Above & Beyond is a live album by jazz musician Freddie Hubbard recorded on June 17, 1982,  at San Francisco's Keystone Korner and released on the Metropolitan label in 1999. The Allmusic review by Scott Yanow calls Hubbard's playing on the album "stunning improvisations full of fire, technical wizardry and creative ideas".

Track listing 
All compositions by Freddie Hubbard except as indicated
 "Softly, as in a Morning Sunrise" (Oscar Hammerstein II, Sigmund Romberg)  – 17:59  
 "I Love You" (Cole Porter)  – 9:07  
 "Thermo"  – 12:57  
 "Little Sunflower" (Hubbard, Al Jarreau)  – 16:57  
 "Byrdlike"  – 11:17  
 Recorded at Keystone Korner, San Francisco; June 17, 1982

Personnel 
 Freddie Hubbard – trumpet
 Billy Childs – piano
 Herbie Lewis: bass
 Louis Hayes – drums

References 

Metropolitan Records albums
1999 live albums
Freddie Hubbard live albums
Albums recorded at Keystone Korner